One Pro Wrestling (abbreviated as 1PW) is a British professional wrestling promotion. 1PW was founded in 2005 by Steven Gauntley. Originally run by the now defunct retail chain 1 Up Games, the company's headquarters were located in Doncaster

The promotion went into liquidation in 2007; however they would restart within the same year, until August 2013, when they announced their closure.

In April 2022, the promotion announced its return, with its first event, A New Twist of Fate, taking place on 1 October at the Doncaster Dome. The event is available on Premier Streaming Network.

Championships

Relaunch
On 11 April 2022, 1PW announced its relaunch, with its first event (A New Twist Of Fate) taking place on 1 October 2022. Rob Van Dam, Jamie Hayter, Mickie James, Christopher Daniels, Cara Noir, Nick Aldis appeared on the show, with the event being shown on FITE TV.

A follow up event (No Turning Back) scheduled for 18 February 2023 includes the 1PW debut of Will Ospreay taking on the hometown wrestler in Robbie X. John Morrison and  Rhyno are also due to debut in Lincoln.

On 22 April 2023 1PW will return to the Doncaster Dome with All or Nothing to crown the new Men's, Women's and Tag World Champions.

References

External links
Official website

British professional wrestling promotions
2005 establishments in the United Kingdom
2013 disestablishments in the United Kingdom